The Martin scale is an older version of color scale commonly used in physical anthropology to establish more or less precisely the eye color of an individual. It was created by the anthropologist Rudolf Martin in the first half of the 20th century. Later he improved this scale with cooperation of Bruno K. Schultz, leading to the Martin-Schultz scale.

Original scale 
The original Martin scale, summarized below, consists of 16 colors (from light blue to dark brown-black) that correspond to the different eye colors observed in nature due to the amount of melanin in the iris. The numbering is reversed in order to match the Martin–Schultz scale, which is still used in biological anthropology. In this case, the higher the number, the lighter the eye color.

Light and light-mixed eyes (16-9) 

 16: light-blue iris
 15-14-13: blue iris
 12-11: light-gray iris
 10-9: dark-gray iris

Mixed eyes (8-7) 

 8: green iris
 7: green-brown iris

Dark-mixed eyes (6-5) 

 6: hazel iris
 5: light-brown iris

Dark eyes (4-1) 

 4: brown iris
 3-2: dark-brown iris
 1: black-brown iris

Older versions 
Older versions of the Martin scale eye color chart have the following color divisions:
 16-12: light and light-mixed iris
 11-7: mixed iris
 6-5: dark-mixed iris
 4-1: dark iris

See also
 Eye color
 Martin–Schultz scale
 Human eye

Notes

Biological anthropology
Color scales
Eye color